The FIBA AmeriCup All-Tournament Team is a FIBA award that is given every four years (previously every two years), and is awarded to the five best players throughout the FIBA AmeriCup tournament.

Honourees

See also
 FIBA AmeriCup Most Valuable Player
 FIBA Basketball World Cup Most Valuable Player
 FIBA Basketball World Cup All-Tournament Team
 FIBA Awards

References

External links
FIBA Americas official website

Team
Basketball trophies and awards